Sir Fitzroy Edward Kelly (9 October 1796 – 18 September 1880) was an English commercial lawyer, Tory politician and judge. He was the last Lord Chief Baron of the Exchequer

Background and education
Kelly was born in London, the son of Robert Hawke Kelly (died in or before 1807), a captain in the Royal Navy. His mother was the novelist Isabella Kelly, daughter of Captain William Fordyce, Groom of the Privy Chamber to George III. In 1824, he was called to the bar by Lincoln's Inn, having already gained a reputation as a skilled special pleader.

Career

In 1834 Kelly was made a King's Counsel, remarkably after only ten years' call. A strong Tory, he was returned as Member of Parliament for Ipswich in 1835, but was unseated on petition. In 1837 however he again became member for that town. From 1843 to 1847 he was MP for Cambridge, and in 1852 was elected member for Harwich, but with a vacancy suddenly occurring in East Suffolk, he preferred to contest that seat and was elected.

Most of his legal cases were of a commercial nature, but one was one of the great criminal poisoning crimes of the early Victorian period. In March 1845 Kelly defended John Tawell, the "Quaker murderer," was in fact no longer a member of the Quakers, though he did try to return to that group. Tawell had poisoned his mistress, Sarah Hart, and fled from Salt Hill in Aylesbury by train. However, a description of Tawell was sent to London by electric telegraph, and he was captured. Kelly did the best he could for his client, but he was not accustomed to criminal defence. His argument that Sarah Hart had eaten too many apple pips and been poisoned by the prussic acid in the pips led to the nickname "Apple-pip," which followed Kelly for the rest of his life. Despite his endeavours, his client was found guilty and hanged.

Kelly was Solicitor-General in 1845 (when he was knighted) and again from February to December 1852, during which time he was junior to Attorney-General Sir Frederic Thesiger in the prosecution of John Henry Newman for libel, the Achilli trial. In 1858–1859 he was Attorney General in Lord Derby's second ministry. In 1866 he was raised to the bench as the last Lord Chief Baron of the Exchequer and made a member of the Privy Council, entitling him to sit on the Judicial Committee of the Privy Council.

Kelly died at Brighton on 18 September 1880, aged 83. He was buried on the western side of Highgate Cemetery.

Arms

See also
Politics of the United Kingdom

References

Bibliography

 Gowing, Richard (1875) 'Sir Fitzroy Kelly, Lord Chief Baron' in: Richard Gowing Public Men of Ipswich and East Suffolk. a series of personal sketches. Ipswich: Scopes; London: Grant & Co., 1875; pp. 71–78

External links 
 
 

1796 births
1880 deaths
Burials at Highgate Cemetery
English King's Counsel
Conservative Party (UK) MPs for English constituencies
Members of the Privy Council of the United Kingdom
Solicitors General for England and Wales
Attorneys General for England and Wales
Chief Barons of the Exchequer
Knights Bachelor
UK MPs 1835–1837
UK MPs 1837–1841
UK MPs 1841–1847
UK MPs 1852–1857
UK MPs 1857–1859
UK MPs 1859–1865
UK MPs 1865–1868
Members of the Parliament of the United Kingdom for Ipswich
Members of the Judicial Committee of the Privy Council